Seeheim is a settlement in the ǁKaras Region of southern Namibia. The only notable structures in Seeheim today are the hotel and the railway station; only a handful of people live there. Seeheim belongs to the Keetmanshoop Rural electoral constituency.

History 
Seeheim was founded in 1896 as a base for the German Schutztruppe. Early in the 20th century its sole purpose was that of a junction station where the lines from Keetmanshoop diverted to Lüderitz and Karasburg. The line Keetmanshoop-Lüderitz was built from 1905 to 1908, the line Keetmanshoop-Karasburg in 1909. The First World War was the reason to build these railway links through inhospitable land. Soon however, transport demand peaked due to the diamond rush that developed after a railway worker picked up a diamond near Grasplatz station, 24 kilometers east of Lüderitz. People travelling from the inland to Lüderitz had to stay overnight at Seeheim junction. This was the reason for the erection of two hotels, one of which is again in operation today after standing empty for 30 years.

In the 1950s, Seeheim was a settlement of considerable size. Afterwards, the town gradually fell into decline.  The school closed down and the residents began to leave.

Transport 
In 1974 the main road B2 was re-directed, leaving Seeheim in the middle of nowhere with only a small gravel access road, and the railway access.

Seeheim station today is part of the Namibian Railways. The passenger line to Lüderitz has been defunct for many years because the rails were destroyed between Aus and Lüderitz. This missing section is currently being rebuilt. Until its estimated finish in 2010, the few irregular passenger trains to the West end in Aus.

Economic activities 
Apart from Seeheim Hotel, a nostalgic stopover for tourists on their way to Fish River Canyon, there is a furniture maker.

See also 
 Railway stations in Namibia

References 

Populated places in the ǁKaras Region
1896 establishments in German South West Africa
Populated places established in 1896